Stanford Training Area SSSI is part of the British Army Stanford Training Area. It is a  biological and geological Site of Special Scientific Interest north of Thetford in Norfolk. It is a  Nature Conservation Review site and part of it is a Geological Conservation Review site.   It is also part of the Breckland Special Area of Conservation and Special Protection Area.

This site contains an extensive area of species-rich Breckland grassland and heath. Wetlands and pools  have wildfowl and many rare invertebrates. The Devil's Punchbowl is geologically important for its deep depression formed by the collapse of Pleistocene glacial sands and boulder clays.

Public access to the site is restricted.

References

Sites of Special Scientific Interest in Norfolk
Geological Conservation Review sites
Nature Conservation Review sites
Special Protection Areas in England
Special Areas of Conservation in England